Elachista boursini is a moth of the family Elachistidae that is found on the Iberian Peninsula and Sardinia.

References

boursini
Moths described in 1951
Moths of Europe